Vågsbygd Church is a parish church of the Church of Norway in Kristiansand Municipality in Agder county, Norway. It is located in the Augland neighborhood in the borough of Vågsbygd in the city of Kristiansand. It is the church for the Vågsbygd parish which is part of the Kristiansand domprosti (arch-deanery) in the Diocese of Agder og Telemark. The gray, stone church was built in a rectangular design in 1967 using plans drawn up by the architect Christen A. Christensen. The church seats about 450 people.

Media gallery

See also
List of churches in Agder og Telemark

References

Churches in Kristiansand
Stone churches in Norway
20th-century Church of Norway church buildings
Churches completed in 1967
1967 establishments in Norway